Torque magazine is a monthly motorsport magazine which is published by The Race Drivers Academy in the United Kingdom.  It was first released in September 2008.  The magazine's tag line is that it is 'By Drivers, For Drivers'.  The magazine is written solely by racing drivers and includes interviews, guest columnists and articles written by other racing drivers.  Whilst the main objective initially was to document news and mini biographies of The Race Drivers Academy's drivers, Torque has since attracted some top motorsport celebrities for interviews and its open stance on many issues has seen it become popular amongst hardcore racing fans.  Torque prides itself in being open and honest in its views on the motorsport world.

Torque Online 
In October 2008, in addition to the monthly release of the magazine, Torque Online was launched to keep readers up to date with news, competitions and downloadable versions of the magazine.  Torque Online is also the most popular method of subscribing to the publication.

Editors 
The two main editors of Torque are (were?) students of The Race Drivers Academy which is a company based at Silverstone.  Both editors, Richard Puddle and Oliver Lewis, have raced at club and national level in saloon car and single seater racing, whilst contributary writer Chris Dymond, races a Jaguar XKR in FIA GT3.

References

External links 

The Race Drivers Academy website
Silverstone website
Richard Puddle Driver Database Page
Chris Dymond Driver Database Page

Auto racing magazines
Sports magazines published in the United Kingdom
Monthly magazines published in the United Kingdom
Magazines established in 2008
Online magazines published in the United Kingdom